In geometry, uniform honeycombs in hyperbolic space are tessellations of convex uniform polyhedron cells. In 3-dimensional hyperbolic space there are 23 Coxeter group families of paracompact uniform honeycombs, generated as Wythoff constructions, and represented by ring permutations of the Coxeter diagrams for each family. These families can produce uniform honeycombs with infinite or unbounded facets or vertex figure, including ideal vertices at infinity, similar to the hyperbolic uniform tilings in 2-dimensions.

Regular paracompact honeycombs 

Of the uniform paracompact H3 honeycombs, 11 are regular, meaning that their group of symmetries acts transitively on their flags.  These have Schläfli symbol {3,3,6}, {6,3,3}, {3,4,4}, {4,4,3}, {3,6,3}, {4,3,6}, {6,3,4}, {4,4,4}, {5,3,6}, {6,3,5}, and {6,3,6}, and are shown below. Four have finite Ideal polyhedral cells: {3,3,6}, {4,3,6}, {3,4,4}, and {5,3,6}.

Coxeter groups of paracompact uniform honeycombs 

This is a complete enumeration of the 151 unique Wythoffian paracompact uniform honeycombs generated from tetrahedral fundamental domains (rank 4 paracompact coxeter groups). The honeycombs are indexed here for cross-referencing duplicate forms, with brackets around the nonprimary constructions.

The alternations are listed, but are either repeats or don't generate uniform solutions. Single-hole alternations represent a mirror removal operation. If an end-node is removed, another simplex (tetrahedral) family is generated. If a hole has two branches, a Vinberg polytope is generated, although only Vinberg polytope with mirror symmetry are related to the simplex groups, and their uniform honeycombs have not been systematically explored. These nonsimplectic (pyramidal) Coxeter groups are not enumerated on this page, except as special cases of half groups of the tetrahedral ones. Six uniform honeycombs that arise here as alternations have been numbered 152 to 157, after the 151 Wythoffian forms not requiring alternation for their construction.

The complete list of nonsimplectic (non-tetrahedral) paracompact Coxeter groups was published by P. Tumarkin in 2003. The doubled fundamental domain changes from a tetrahedron into a quadrilateral pyramid.

Another nonsimplectic half groups is  ↔ .

A radical nonsimplectic subgroup is  ↔ , which can be doubled into a triangular prism domain as  ↔ .

Linear graphs

[6,3,3] family

[6,3,4] family 

There are 15 forms, generated by ring permutations of the Coxeter group: [6,3,4] or

[6,3,5] family

[6,3,6] family 
There are 9 forms, generated by ring permutations of the Coxeter group: [6,3,6] or

[3,6,3] family 

There are 9 forms, generated by ring permutations of the Coxeter group: [3,6,3] or

[4,4,3] family 
There are 15 forms, generated by ring permutations of the Coxeter group: [4,4,3] or

[4,4,4] family 

Tridental graphs

[3,41,1] family 
There are 11 forms (of which only 4 are not shared with the [4,4,3] family), generated by ring permutations of the Coxeter group:

[4,41,1] family 
There are 7 forms, (all shared with [4,4,4] family), generated by ring permutations of the Coxeter group:

[6,31,1] family 

Cyclic graphs

[(4,4,3,3)] family 
There are 11 forms, 4 unique to this family, generated by ring permutations of the Coxeter group: , with  ↔ .

[(4,4,4,3)] family 
There are 9 forms, generated by ring permutations of the Coxeter group: .

[(4,4,4,4)] family 
There are 5 forms, 1 unique, generated by ring permutations of the Coxeter group: . Repeat constructions are related as:  ↔ ,  ↔ , and  ↔ .

[(6,3,3,3)] family 
There are 9 forms, generated by ring permutations of the Coxeter group: .

[(6,3,4,3)] family 
There are 9 forms, generated by ring permutations of the Coxeter group:

[(6,3,5,3)] family 
There are 9 forms, generated by ring permutations of the Coxeter group:

[(6,3,6,3)] family 
There are 6 forms, generated by ring permutations of the Coxeter group: .

Loop-n-tail graphs

[3,3[3]] family 

[4,3[3]] family 

[5,3[3]] family 

[6,3[3]] family 

Multicyclic graphs

[3[ ]×[ ]] family 
There are 8 forms, 1 unique, generated by ring permutations of the Coxeter group: . Two are duplicated as  ↔ , two as  ↔ , and three as  ↔ .

[3[3,3]] family 
There are 4 forms, 0 unique, generated by ring permutations of the Coxeter group: . They are repeated in four families:  ↔  (index 2 subgroup),
 ↔  (index 4 subgroup), 
 ↔  (index 6 subgroup), and 
 ↔  (index 24 subgroup).

Summary enumerations by family

Linear graphs

Tridental graphs

Cyclic graphs

Loop-n-tail graphs 
Symmetry in these graphs can be doubled by adding a mirror: [1[n,3[3]]] = [n,3,6]. Therefore ring-symmetry graphs are repeated in the linear graph families.

See also 
 Uniform tilings in hyperbolic plane
 List of regular polytopes#Tessellations of hyperbolic 3-space

Notes

References 
 James E. Humphreys, Reflection Groups and Coxeter Groups, Cambridge studies in advanced mathematics, 29 (1990)
 The Beauty of Geometry: Twelve Essays (1999), Dover Publications,  (Chapter 10, Regular Honeycombs in Hyperbolic Space)
Coxeter, Regular Polytopes, 3rd. ed., Dover Publications, 1973. . (Tables I and II: Regular polytopes and honeycombs, pp. 294–296)
 Jeffrey R. Weeks The Shape of Space, 2nd edition  (Chapter 16-17: Geometries on Three-manifolds I,II)
 Coxeter Decompositions of Hyperbolic Tetrahedra, arXiv/PDF, A. Felikson, December 2002
 C. W. L. Garner, Regular Skew Polyhedra in Hyperbolic Three-Space Can. J. Math. 19, 1179-1186, 1967. PDF 
Norman Johnson, Geometries and Transformations, (2018) Chapters 11,12,13
N. W. Johnson, R. Kellerhals, J. G. Ratcliffe, S. T. Tschantz, The size of a hyperbolic Coxeter simplex, Transformation Groups (1999), Volume 4, Issue 4, pp 329–353  
 N.W. Johnson, R. Kellerhals, J.G. Ratcliffe,S.T. Tschantz, Commensurability classes of hyperbolic Coxeter groups, (2002) H3: p130. 
 

Honeycombs (geometry)